Epimetasia is a genus of moths of the family Crambidae.

Species
Epimetasia abbasalis Amsel, 1974
Epimetasia albalis Amsel, 1959
Epimetasia eoa (Meyrick, 1936)
Epimetasia gregori Amsel, 1970
Epimetasia monotona (Amsel, 1953)
Epimetasia rhodobaphialis (Ragonot, 1894)
Epimetasia rufoarenalis (Rothschild, 1913)
Epimetasia vestalis (Ragonot, 1894)

References

Odontiini
Crambidae genera
Taxa named by Émile Louis Ragonot